Hamid Mahmood Butt is the former principal of Services Institute of Medical Sciences, chair of Department of Ophthalmology and Visual Sciences, and patron of Services Hospital. He served as the ex-Chair of Department of Ophthalmology and Visual Sciences at Fatima Jinnah Medical College.

On August 1, 2017, the Specialized Healthcare and Medical Education Department made him an Officer on Special Duty on administrative basis following the strike by the young doctors.

References 

Living people
People from Lahore
Academic staff of the Services Institute of Medical Sciences
Pakistani ophthalmologists
Recipients of the Pride of Performance
Year of birth missing (living people)